The following radio stations broadcast on AM frequency 1638 kHz:

In Australia 
 2ME Radio Arabic in Castle Hill, New South Hills.
 Vision Christian Radio in Armidale,  New South Wales.

References

Lists of radio stations by frequency